The 1907 Calgary municipal election was held on December 9, 1907 to elect a Mayor and twelve Aldermen to sit on the twenty-fourth Calgary City Council from January 2, 1908 to January 2, 1909.

Background
The election was held under multiple non-transferable vote where each elector was able to cast a ballot for the mayor and up to three ballots for separate councillors with a voter's designated ward.

The election became a bitter affair with the Calgary Herald supporting Mayor Cameron and the Morning Albertan supporting Alderman Simon John Clarke. The Morning Albertan called Clarke "a man who does things" and claimed the city's financial position would have been better under his stewardship, while criticizing Cameron for closed council meetings and "autocratic rule".

The Morning Albertan charged Mayor Cameron with engineering the bylaw to form a commission in order to provide himself a well paying job. The Morning Albertan claimed the commission bylaw was crafted in a in camera City Council meeting was held to form the commission with three members each paid $2,500: Mayor Cameron, Alderman Harry William White and Alderman Arthur Garnet Graves. The charge was contrasted with the City Council decision to lay off 250 public works employees. Alderman White refuted the charges against Mayor Cameron in the Morning Albertan, going so far as to offer $1,000 if the writer (whom the Morning Albertan acknowledged as publisher William McCartney Davidson) could provide evidence for his claims. Claims also surfaced in the Calgary Herald that as Alderman, Simon John Clarke paved numerous sidewalks throughout the city without authorization or report from City Council or the relevant committees. The Calgary Herald claimed that Clarke and his agents paid for the article in the Morning Albertan, which the Morning Albertan refuted by publishing affidavits of Clarke and his agent J.Y. Byers the next day.

Clarke campaigned on record as alderman including his role as chairman on the Public Works Committee, the election of a commission, municipal meetings open to the public, and financial restraint during difficult times, while Cameron ran on his record extending the waterworks system, improvements to St. George's Island, and missing only one City Council meeting in the previous year.

Results
Election results as reported by the Calgary Herald and Morning Albertan.

Mayor

Councillors

Ward 1

Ward 2

Ward 3

Ward 4

See also
List of Calgary municipal elections

References

Municipal elections in Calgary
1907 elections in Canada
1900s in Calgary